is a railway station located in the city of Sakata, Yamagata Prefecture, Japan, operated by the East Japan Railway Company (JR East).

Lines
Minamichōkai Station is served by the Uetsu Main Line, and is located 175.9 rail kilometers from the terminus of the line at Niitsu Station.

Station layout
The station has two opposed side platforms connected by a footbridge. The station is unattended

Platforms

History
Minamichōkai Station opened on January 16, 1952 as a station on JNR (Japan National Railway). It has been unattended since September 1972. With the privatization of the JNR on April 1, 1987, the station came under the control of the East Japan Railway Company.

Surrounding area
Minamiyuza Post Office
Minamiyuza Elementary School

See also
List of railway stations in Japan

References

External links

 JR East Station information 

Railway stations in Japan opened in 1952
Railway stations in Yamagata Prefecture
Uetsu Main Line
Sakata, Yamagata